Binago is a comune (municipality) in the Province of Como in the Italian region Lombardy, located about  northwest of Milan and about  southwest of Como.

Binago borders the following municipalities: Beregazzo con Figliaro, Castelnuovo Bozzente, Malnate, Solbiate, Vedano Olona, Venegono Inferiore, Venegono Superiore.

Demographic evolution

References

External links
 www.comune.binago.co.it/

Cities and towns in Lombardy